Jungle Jim is the fictional hero of a series of jungle adventures in various media. The series began on January 7, 1934, as an American newspaper comic strip chronicling the adventures of Asia-based hunter Jim Bradley, who was nicknamed Jungle Jim. The character also trekked through radio, film, comic book and television adaptations.  Notable was a series of films and television episodes in which Johnny Weissmuller portrayed the safari-suit wearing character, after hanging up his Tarzan loincloth. The strip concluded on August 8, 1954.

Publication history 
The strip was created by King Features Syndicate in order to compete with the popular United Feature Syndicate comic strip Tarzan, by Hal Foster.    

Illustrator Alex Raymond and pulp magazine author Don Moore created the original strip as a topper to run above Raymond's Flash Gordon. Jungle Jim and Flash Gordon were launched simultaneously on January 7, 1934.  The character was named after Alex's brother Jim Raymond. 

During World War II, artist Raymond enlisted as a Marine. Successors included John Mayo (creator of Future Eye) and Paul Norris (creator of DC Comics' Aquaman). Don Moore continued to script through the succession of artists. The strip, which never ran as a daily, came to an end in 1954.

From 1937 to 1947, the comic strip was reprinted in Ace Comics, published by David McKay. From 1949 to 1951, there were 11 original Jungle Jim comic books produced by Standard Comics. Dell Comics published 20 issues of Jungle Jim from 1953 to 1959; the last eight issues (#13–20) were written by Gaylord Du Bois. 

King Features Syndicate published a single issue of Jungle Jim in 1967. This was designated #5 and was a reprint of Dell's issue #5 with a new cover by Wally Wood. Charlton Comics then picked up Dell's numbering for another seven issues (#22–28) in 1969–70 with stories scripted by Wood, Pat Boyette, Bhob Stewart, Joe Gill and others. Artists on the Charlton stories were Wood, Boyette, Steve Ditko, Roger Brand and Tom Palmer.

In January 2015, Dynamite Entertainment announced a new series of Jungle Jim as part of their "King:Dynamite" series. This version of Jungle Jim is written by Paul Tobin and illustrated by Sandy Jarrell.

Characters and story
Unlike the  protagonists of Tarzan, Ka-Zar, Kaanga and other comics with jungle themes, Jim Bradley was based in Southeastern Asia rather than Africa, and he was a hunter rather than a wild man in a loincloth.

Other characters included the large, strong native Kolu (who served his white comrade Jim in a manner somewhat similar to the character of Lothar in Mandrake the Magician). The femme fatale Lille DeVrille was added to the cast two years after the strip's debut.

The comic's early years generally featured stories revolving around pirates, slave traders and other common jungle antagonists. As World War II approached, Jungle Jim, like many American comics, developed a wartime theme, with Jim fighting the Japanese, and it moved from its position as a topper strip to its own independent Sunday page.

Other media

Radio
Syndicated by Hearst and sponsored by the Comic Weekly, The Adventures of Jungle Jim radio series premiered November 2, 1935. Matt Crowley had the title role for three years, until Gerald Mohr stepped in as Jungle Jim beginning April 24, 1938. Vicki Vola and Franc Hale portrayed Shanghai Lil, and Juano Hernandez was the Hindu servant Kolu. Each episode ran 15 minutes. Several episodes were based directly on the comic strip, such as The Ghost of the Java Sea. Gene Stafford scripted for producer Jay Clark. Glenn Riggs was the announcer, among others. In the opening episode, "The Bat Woman," Jungle Jim meets Miss Chalmers, and Jacques LaBarr gets into a barroom fight with Jim.

Serial
A 12-part Jungle Jim movie serial by Universal Pictures, starring Grant Withers, was released in 1937.

Feature films
Columbia Pictures produced a series of 16 Jungle Jim B-movies from 1948 to 1955, set in Africa and starring Johnny Weissmuller, who had gained fame playing Tarzan. In the last three of these movies, the name "Jungle Jim" was not used. Rather the main character was referred to in the films as "Johnny Weissmuller", with Weissmuller essentially playing an idealized version of himself, as did cowboy stars Roy Rogers and Gene Autry. This was because these three features were produced concurrently with a "Jungle Jim" TV series starring Weissmuller produced by Columbia's Screen Gems (see below) and the series at that point had the rights to the brand "Jungle Jim." (The "Weissmuller" jungle character was otherwise indistinguishable from Jungle Jim, and the final three films are commonly referred to as "Jungle Jim movies" though that is not technically accurate.)

Jungle Jim (1948)
The Lost Tribe (1949)
Mark of the Gorilla (1950)
Captive Girl (1950) co-starred Buster Crabbe
Pygmy Island (1950)
Fury of the Congo (1951)
Jungle Manhunt (1951)
Jungle Jim in the Forbidden Land (1952)
Voodoo Tiger (1952)
Savage Mutiny (1953)
Valley of Head Hunters (1953)
Killer Ape (1953)
Jungle Man-Eaters (1954)
Cannibal Attack (1954)
Jungle Moon Men (1955)
Devil Goddess (1955)

TV series
A single-season Screen Gems television series ran in 1955–56, as Jungle Jim. There were 26 episodes, all starring Weissmuller. (See Jungle Jim (TV series))

Comic Strip Reprints

 Jungle Jim. Street Enterprises Menomonee Falls, Wis. , 1971 (reprints July 14 – October 27, 1935 strips)
 Jungle Jim. Pacific Comics Club, Papeete, Tahiti (reprints April 12, 1936 – June 30, 1937)
 Jungle Jim. Pacific Comics Club, Papeete, Tahiti (reprints March 20, 1938, – August 7, 1938)
 Jungle Jim. Pacific Comics Club, Papeete, Tahiti (reprints August 14, 1938 – May 21, 1939)
 Jungle Jim. Pacific Comics Club, Papeete, Tahiti (reprints September 15, 1940 – May 4, 1941)
 Jungle Jim. Pacific Comics Club, Papeete, Tahiti (reprints June 15, 1941– 20 December 1942)
 The Official Jungle Jim Annual. : Pioneer Comics, Las Vegas, NV  1989
 The Official Jungle Jim Sundays: v. 1  Pioneer Comics, Las Vegas, NV, 1989 (reprints July 14, 1935 – May 16, 1937)
 The Official Jungle Jim Sundays: v. 2, Death In The Jungle Pioneer Comics, Las Vegas, NV, 1989 (reprints May 16, 1937 – March 12, 1939)
 Definitive Flash Gordon and Jungle Jim Volume 1: 1934–1936 San Diego, Calif. IDW Publishing. 
 Definitive Flash Gordon and Jungle Jim Volume 2: 1936–1939 San Diego, Calif. IDW Publishing 
 Definitive Flash Gordon and Jungle Jim Volume 3: 1939–1941 San Diego, Calif. IDW Publishing 
 Definitive Flash Gordon and Jungle Jim Volume 4: 1942–1944 San Diego, Calif. IDW Publishing

Merchandise
In 1957, Louis Marx and Company marketed a Jungle Jim playset with character figures and generic jungle figures (hunters, natives, wild animals).

See also
United Features Syndicate
"Jungle Jim" was first a code name and later a nickname of the 4400th Combat Crew Training Squadron (CCTS) that later changed its name to the 1st Air Commando Group formed in early 1961. Members of the unit wore Jungle Jim-style slouch hats.
Congo Bill
Jungle Jim (serial)
Jungle Jim (film) Titles of feature films
Jungle Jim (TV series)
Bomba the Jungle Boy
Ramar of the Jungle
Tarzanesque

References

External links
 Jungle Jim at Don Markstein's Toonopedia. Archived from the original on October 22, 2016.
 Strickler, Dave. Syndicated Comic Strips and Artists, 1924–1995: The Complete Index. Cambria, California: Comics Access, 1995. 
 Jungle Jim comic books
 Zoot Radio, free old time radio show downloads of Jungle Jim.

Charlton Comics titles
1934 comics debuts
1954 comics endings
Film series introduced in 1948
American comics characters
Comics characters introduced in 1934
Dell Comics titles
Film serial characters
Jungle (genre) comics
Jungle superheroes
Jungle men
American radio dramas
1935 radio programme debuts
Radio programs based on comic strips
Comics adapted into radio series
American comics adapted into films
Comics adapted into television series
Male characters in comics